Members of the New South Wales Legislative Assembly who served in the second parliament of New South Wales held their seats from 1858 to 1859. The Speaker was Sir Daniel Cooper.

See also
Second Cowper ministry
Results of the 1858 New South Wales colonial election
Candidates of the 1858 New South Wales colonial election

Notes
There was no party system in New South Wales politics until 1887. Under the constitution, ministers were required to resign to recontest their seats in a by-election when appointed. These by-elections are only noted when the minister was defeated; in general, he was elected unopposed.

References

Members of New South Wales parliaments by term
19th-century Australian politicians